Derek Ernst (born May 16, 1990) is an American professional golfer who plays on the PGA Tour. He earned his first PGA Tour victory at the 2013 Wells Fargo Championship.

Early life and amateur career
Ernst was born in Woodland, California to Mark and Dawn Ernst. He attended Clovis East High School in Clovis, California and played college golf at UNLV, where he was a four-time All-American and was twice named Mountain West Conference player of the year. He was runner-up at the 2011 U.S. Amateur Public Links championship, losing the final on the 37th hole to Clemson's Corbin Mills. Ernst represented the United States at the 2012 Palmer Cup, and he turned pro following the 2012 U.S. Amateur.

Professional career
Ernst made his professional debut at the 2012 Frys.com Open, where he finished T-41. He earned a 2013 PGA Tour card through qualifying school, surviving all four stages. He finished T-59 in his season debut at the Sony Open in Hawaii. After missing the cut in each of his next five starts, he rehired Aaron Terry, his first golf instructor, as his caddy. Ernst finished T-47 in his next event, the Zurich Classic of New Orleans. In May, he notched his first PGA Tour victory at the Wells Fargo Championship, defeating David Lynn in a playoff.

Ernst was the fourth alternate and 1,207th in the world rankings at the start of the week. He was scheduled to play on the Web.com Tour's Stadion Classic at UGA when he received a last-minute call that tee times were available; a number of golfers withdrew due to weather and unfavorable course conditions. The win also moved Ernst from 196th to 32nd in the FedEx Cup standings, and earned him entry into The Players Championship as the final guaranteed entrant, the 2013 PGA Championship, and the 2014 Masters Tournament, plus a PGA Tour exemption through 2015. Ernst was the second consecutive Q school graduate to win, following Billy Horschel's win at the Zurich Classic of New Orleans. He also skyrocketed to 123rd in the Official World Golf Ranking and was the first alternate to win a PGA Tour event since Wes Short Jr.'s victory at the 2005 Michelin Championship at Las Vegas.

Personal life
Ernst has two sisters, Brianna and Shawna. He has blurry vision in his right eye as the result of an injury he sustained in the second grade. Using a children's tool set at home while making a Valentine's Day present for his mother, a shard of PVC bounced up and cut his eye, requiring 10 stitches. Scar tissue remains in the eye and his depth perception is poor.

Professional wins (1)

PGA Tour wins (1)

PGA Tour playoff record (1–0)

Results in major championships

CUT = missed the half-way cut
"T" indicates a tie for a place

Results in The Players Championship

CUT = missed the halfway cut

Results in World Golf Championships

"T" = Tied

U.S. national team appearances
Amateur
Palmer Cup: 2012

See also
2012 PGA Tour Qualifying School graduates
2015 Web.com Tour Finals graduates

References

External links

Profile on UNLV's official athletic site

American male golfers
UNLV Rebels men's golfers
PGA Tour golfers
Korn Ferry Tour graduates
Golfers from California
People from Woodland, California
Sportspeople from Clovis, California
Sportspeople from Fresno, California
1990 births
Living people